The College of Chaplains of the Ecclesiastical Household of the Sovereign of the United Kingdom is under the Clerk of the Closet, an office dating from 1437. It is normally held by a diocesan bishop, who may, however, remain in office after leaving his see. The current Clerk is James Newcome, Bishop of Carlisle.

The Clerk of the Closet is responsible for advising the Private Secretary to the Sovereign on the names for candidates to fill vacancies in the Roll of Chaplains to the Sovereign. He presents bishops for homage to the Sovereign, examines any theological books to be presented to the Sovereign, and preaches annually in the Chapel Royal, St James's Palace. He receives a salary of £7 a year.

The Deputy Clerk of the Closet, an office dating from 1677, is the Domestic Chaplain to the Sovereign, and Sub-Dean of the Chapel Royal, and is the sole full-time clerical member of the Household.

Other members of the royal family may also have their own Clerk of the Closet.

List of Clerks of the Closet of the Sovereign's Household 
 James Newcome, Bishop of Carlisle 2014–
 Christopher Hill, KCVO, Bishop of Guildford 2005–2014
 Jonathan Bailey, KCVO, Bishop of Derby 1997–2005
 John Waine, KCVO Bishop of Chelmsford 1989–1997
 John Bickersteth, KCVO Bishop of Bath and Wells 1979–1989
 Gordon Fallows, KCVO Bishop of Sheffield 1975–1979
 Roger Wilson, KCVO Bishop of Chichester 1963–1975
 Percy Herbert, KCVO Bishop of Norwich 1942–1963
 Cyril Garbett, GCVO Bishop of Winchester 1937–1942
 Thomas Banks Strong, GBE Bishop of Oxford 1925–1937
 Hubert Murray Burge, Bishop of Oxford 1918–1925
 William Boyd-Carpenter, KCVO Bishop of Ripon 1903–1918
 Randall Davidson, KCVO Bishop of Rochester 1891–1903
 Henry Philpott, Bishop of Worcester 1865–1891
 John Graham, Bishop of Chester 1849–1865
 Edward Stanley, Bishop of Norwich 1837–1849
 Robert James Carr, Bishop of Chichester 1827–1837
 George Pelham, Bishop of Exeter 1815–1827
 William Jackson, Bishop of Oxford by 1813–1815
 Richard Hurd, Bishop of Worcester 1781–1808
 William Buller 1763–1773 (later Bishop of Exeter)
 John Thomas, Bishop of Salisbury, Bishop of Winchester 1757–1763
 John Gilbert, Bishop of Salisbury 1752–1757
 Joseph Butler, Bishop of Bristol 1746–1752
 Henry Egerton, Bishop of Hereford 1735–1746
 Richard Willis, Bishop of Winchester 1723–1734
 Charles Trimnell, Bishop of Norwich 1714–1723
 William Graham, Dean of Carlisle 1702–1714 (jointly)
 John Younger, Dean of Salisbury 1702–1714 (jointly)
 Samuel Pratt, Dean of Rochester 1702–1714 (jointly)
 Hon. John Montagu, Dean of Durham 1695–1702
 Thomas Burnet 1691–1695
 James Canaries 1691–1692 (representing Scottish Episcopalian Church)
 John Tillotson, Dean of St Paul's 1689–1691
 Sir Edward Petre S.J. 1687–1693 (after 1689 in exile with James II)
 Thomas Sprat, Bishop of Rochester 1685–1687
 Hon. Nathaniel Crew, Dean of Chichester, Bishop of Oxford, Bishop of Durham 1669–1685
 Walter Blandford, Bishop of Worcester 1668–1669
 John Dolben, Dean of Westminster 1664–1668
 John Earle, Bishop of Salisbury 1651–1664 (1651–1660 in exile with Charles II)
 Gilbert Sheldon 1646–1651 later Archbishop of Canterbury
 Richard Steward 1636–1646 designated Dean of St Paul's
 Matthew Wren, Bishop of Hereford 1633–1636
 William Juxon, Dean of Worcester 1632–1633
 Walter Balcanquhall 1617–1621 (represented the Church of Scotland at the Synod of Dort)
 Richard Neile, Archbishop of York 1603–1632
 John Thornborough, Bishop of Limerick 1588–1603
 John Rycarde c.1556
 John Rudd 1540s
 Edward Layton, Archdeacon of Sarum by 1538–after 1544
 Edward Higgins c.1520
 Geoffrey Wren 1510- >1515
 Edward Atherton

Clerks of the Closet in other Royal Households 
 Henry Burton, Clerk of the Closet to Henry Frederick, Prince of Wales
 William Stanley, Clerk of the Closet to Queen Mary 1689–1694
 Lancelot Blackburne, Clerk of the Closet to Caroline of Ansbach
 Isaac Maddox, Clerk of the Closet to Caroline of Ansbach 1729–1736
 Joseph Butler, Clerk of the Closet to Caroline of Ansbach 1736–37
 Francis Ayscough, Clerk of the Closet to Frederick, Prince of Wales 1736–51
 Samuel Squire, Clerk of the Closet to the Prince of Wales 1756-
 Rev Dr Lockman, Clerk of the Closet to the Prince of Wales 1787–1808
 Frederick William Blomberg, Clerk of the Closet to the Prince of Wales 1808-
 Edward Young, Clerk of the Closet to Princess Augusta of Saxe-Gotha 1761–1765

References 

 

 
Positions within the British Royal Household
Anglican ecclesiastical offices
1437 establishments in England